was a village located in Atsuta District, Ishikari Subprefecture, Hokkaido, Japan. The village was situated on the west coast of Hokkaido on Route 231 between Ishikari City and Hamamasu.

As of 2004, the village had an estimated population of 2,592 and a density of 8.85 persons per km2. The total area was 292.84 km2.

Fishing and farming are the main industries in this area.

On October 1, 2005, Atsuta, along with the village of Hamamasu (from Hamamasu District) was merged into the expanded city of Ishikari.

Climate

See also
 Atsuta District, Hokkaido

References

External links
 Link to photo of Atsuta village

Dissolved municipalities of Hokkaido
Ishikari, Hokkaido